

Number Plan
Colombia operates a closed dialing plan, with all fixed line and mobile subscriber numbers being 10-digit.

Nationally, all calls between subscribers are dialed as ten digits, with no prefix.

History
Prior to September 2021, Colombia had fixed line subscriber numbers that comprised a single digit dialing zone and a 7-digit local number.
These were converted to the new format by inserting "60" before the dialing zone.

There were various dial plans, with different access prefixes depending on the type of service. All such prefixes have been removed, except for international calls from landlines.

Landline service

All landline subscriber numbers follow the pattern:
60B-YXX-XXXX
Where B is the dialing zone (where the number is located), 
Y is 2 to 8 (or 9 for pay phones),
and X is any digit.

Each department belongs to only one dialing zone.

Calls from landlines to both landline and mobile numbers are placed by dialing the 10-digit subscriber number with no prefix.

Calling internationally from Colombian landlines requires a carrier-selection code be included after the 00 IDD prefix, before the country code and foreign subscriber number:

00A-XX... Where XX represents the destination country dialing code and A represents one of the national long-distance carriers, but new long distance operators are using 0Axy format:

Mobile service

As with landlines, calls from mobile phones to both landline and mobile numbers are placed by dialing the 10-digit subscriber number with no prefix.

Mobile subscriber numbers follow the pattern:
3MM-XXX-XXXX
where 3MM usually indicates the one of the country's mobile phone operators.

Since Colombia adopted the mobile number portability, these 3MM codes only indicate the original operator when the subscriber obtained the number; individual subscriber numbers may use other operators.

Toll-free service
Toll-free numbers follow the pattern:
01-800-XXX-XXXX

Before 2002, the format was 9800-XXXXXX. When the current format was adopted in that year, existing toll-free numbers were given the format 01-800-0XX-XXXX. These numbers were advertised with the grouping 01-8000-XX-XXX, leading many people to erroneously believe that the general prefix for toll-free numbers is 01-8000.

Other services

Toll-based service
01-900-XXX-XXXX
01-901-XXX-XXXX

Dial-up Internet service billed per minute
01-947-XXX-XXXX
01-948-XXX-XXXX

Emergency numbers
1-2-3, for all emergency services.
1-1-2, for only Police services.
1-1-9, for only Firefighting services.
1-3-2, for only Ambulance services.

References

Colombia
Telecommunications in Colombia
Colombia communications-related lists